Terebellum is a genus of sea snails, marine gastropod mollusks in the family Seraphsidae, the Terebellum conchs.

Species
Species within the genus Terebellum include:
 † Terebellum cinctum K. Martin, 1916 
 Terebellum delicatum (Kuroda, T. & Kawamoto, 1956)
 Terebellum hubrechti (Poppe, G.T. & S.P. Tagaro, 2016
 † Terebellum humilispirum Raven, 2021 
 † Terebellum koeneni Marquet, Lenaerts & Laporte, 2016 
 † Terebellum olympiae Rolando, 2001 
 † Terebellum papilliferum K. Martin, 1916 
 Terebellum simoni Dekkers, S. J. Maxwell & Congdon, 2019
 Terebellum terebellum (Linnaeus, 1767)
Species brought into synonymy
 † Terebellum chilophorum Cossmann, 1889: synonym of † Seraphs chilophorus (Cossmann, 1889)  (superseded combination)
 † Terebellum convolutum Lamarck, 1803: synonym of † Seraphs convolutus (Lamarck, 1803) (original combination)
 Terebellum cylindrarium (Pallas, 1766) : synonym of Nereis cylindraria Pallas, 1766
 † Terebellum eratoides Cossmann, 1889: synonym of † Miniseraphs eratoides (Cossmann, 1889)  (superseded combination)
 † Terebellum isabella Deshayes, 1865: synonym of † Miniseraphs isabella (Deshayes, 1865) (superseded combination)
 Terebellum lineatum Röding, 1798 : synonym of Terebellum terebellum (Linnaeus, 1758)
 Terebellum maculosum A. Adams, 1848: synonym of Terebellum subulatum Lamarck, 1811: synonym of Terebellum terebellum (Linnaeus, 1758) (junior synonym)
 † Terebellum olivaceum Cossmann, 1889: synonym of † Seraphs olivaceus (Cossmann, 1889)  (superseded combination)
 Terebellum punctulatum Röding, 1798 : synonym of Terebellum terebellum (Linnaeus, 1758)
 Terebellum striatum Koenen, 1889 † : synonym of Terebellum koeneni Marquet, Lenaerts & Laporte, 2016 † (invalid: junior homonym of Terebellum striatum Tuomey & Holmes, 1857; T. koeneni is a replacement name)
 Terebellum subulatum Lamarck, 1811 : synonym of Terebellum terebellum (Linnaeus, 1758)

References

 Walls, J.G. (1980). Conchs, tibias and harps. A survey of the molluscan families Strombidae and Harpidae. T.F.H. Publications Ltd, Hong Kong.

External links
 Lamarck [J.B.P.A. de M. de. ([1798]). Tableau encyclopédique et méthodique des trois règnes de la nature, Mollusques Testacés. Part 21 [Livraison 64, 29 April 1798]: pls. 287-390 , Paris: H. Agasse ]
 Gistel, Johannes [Nepomuk Franz Xaver. (1848). Naturgeschichte des Tierreichs: für höhere Schulen. [text book]. 1-216, i-xvi, Plates 1-32. Stuttgart. Scheitlin & Krais]
 Rafinesque, C. S. (1815). Analyse de la nature ou Tableau de l'univers et des corps organisés. [Book. 1-224, (self-published) Palermo]

Seraphsidae